Tiankoura is a department or commune of Bougouriba Province in south-western Burkina Faso. Its capital lies at the town of Tiankoura. According to the 1996 census the department has a total population of 13,086  .

Towns and villages
TiankouraBalambiroBombaraDangbaraDiebiroDiouraoElforaGongouraGuimbissenaoKankouraKanseoKimpeoKolonkouraKoulohKourguenouKourouKpoloLobignonaoMinaoNiempiroNkinoraN’tonhiroOdaraOrkounouPalemberaSehintiroSinkiro
SounkpourounaTingueraTiopanaoTordieraUleoWaltièraWangaraYèbèlèlaYèlèla

References

Departments of Burkina Faso
Bougouriba Province